Joseph William Dillon (born August 2, 1975) is an American former professional baseball utility player, who played in Major League Baseball (MLB) for the Florida Marlins, Milwaukee Brewers, and Tampa Bay Rays, and in Nippon Professional Baseball (NPB) for the Yomiuri Giants. He was an assistant hitting coach for the Washington Nationals from 2018 to 2019, before serving as the hitting coach for the Philadelphia Phillies during the 2020 and 2021 seasons.

College 
After graduating from Cardinal Newman High School in Santa Rosa, California in 1993, Dillon entered college at Santa Rosa Junior College and then Texas Tech University.

Professional baseball player

Kansas City Royals organization (1997–2001)
On June 3, 1997, Dillon was drafted by the Kansas City Royals in the 7th round (211th overall) of the 1997 Major League Baseball Draft. He played the  season with the Low-A Spokane Indians, the  season with the Single-A Lansing Lugnuts, and the  season with the High-A Wilmington Blue Rocks. Dillon split the  season between the Double-A Wichita Wranglers and the Triple-A Omaha Royals. During his time with Omaha, he suffered a herniated disc in his back.  He returned to Omaha for the  season.

Minnesota Twins organization (2001–2003)
On December 31, 2001, Dillon was drafted by the Minnesota Twins in the 2001 Rule 5 Draft. For the  season, he was assigned to the Double-A New Britain Rock Cats, spending nearly the entire season there, before being promoted to the Triple-A Edmonton Trappers.

Brief retirement (2003–2004)
Continued problems with his back, including increasing stiffness, prompted Dillon to retire during spring training . On March 24, 2003, he was released from the Twins. During the year, Dillon underwent back surgery to repair the herniated disc. Following that, he returned to his alma mater, Texas Tech University, to coach its 2003 baseball team. His back felt better, and he decided to return to playing professional baseball.

Florida Marlins organization; major league debut (2004–2005)
On March 17, 2004, Dillon was signed as a free agent by the Florida Marlins. He began the  season with the Double-A Carolina Mudcats, before being promoted to the Triple-A Albuquerque Isotopes.

Dillon began the  season with Florida, before returning briefly to Albuquerque. On May 18, 2005, he was recalled to the big leagues, making his MLB debut that same afternoon, when (by an unfortunate coincidence) Marlins starting third-baseman Mike Lowell lost a foul pop-up by Milton Bradley of the Los Angeles Dodgers in the sun, causing Lowell to be struck by the ball in his face, subsequently forcing him to leave the game. Dillon’s stat line for his first major league game included four at bats, one hit, and one strikeout. For the season, in 36 at bats, he posted a batting average of .167 with one home run. After the season, Dillon was granted free agency.

Venados de Mazatlán (2005)
Dillon joined the Mazatlán Deer of the Pacific Mexican Winter League late in the 2004–2005 season, helping the team win the Caribbean Series championship.

Yomiuri Giants (2006)
Dillon was signed by the Yomiuri Giants of Nippon Professional Baseball, for the  season. He played the entire season in Japan.

Florida Marlins organization (2006–2007)
Upon returning to American professional baseball, Dillon re-joined the Florida Marlins, who signed him to a minor league contract, on December 20, 2006. The following spring, he asked for, and received, his release from the contract.

Milwaukee Brewers organization (2007–2008)
On April 1, 2007, Dillon signed a minor league contract with the Milwaukee Brewers, who assigned him to the Triple-A Nashville Sounds of the Pacific Coast League. On August 1, 2007, he was called up to the Brewers along with Elmer Dessens when pitcher Scott Linebrink left on bereavement leave and second baseman Rickie Weeks was sent down to Nashville.

Although expectations were high for Dillon in the off-season prior to the  campaign, he failed to make the big league roster out of spring training, instead finding himself back in Triple-A Nashville. Dillon was recalled by the Brewers, on May 1, 2008; in a corresponding move, the Brewers designated relief pitcher Derrick Turnbow for assignment.

Oakland Athletics organization (2008–2009)
Following the  season, Dillon was claimed off waivers by the Oakland Athletics.

On January 7, 2009, Dillon was designated for assignment to clear a roster spot for Jason Giambi and was sent outright to the minor leagues.

Tampa Bay Rays organization (2009-2010)

On May 10, 2009, Dillon traded by Oakland to the Tampa Bay Rays, in return for Adam Kennedy. Dillon compiled a .300 BA, with one home run, and two RBI.

On December 18, 2009, Dillon re-signed a minor league contract with the Rays. Dillon attempted to add catcher to his list of fielding positions in spring  training of the  season. He retired following his release, November 6, 2010.

Statistics

Coaching career 
On December 20, 2013, Dillon was announced as the hitting coach for the Washington Nationals’ AAA affiliate Syracuse Chiefs. He spent 2016–17 as minor league hitting coordinator for the Miami Marlins.

Dillon was named as the assistant hitting coach for the Nationals for the 2018 season. On November 21, 2019, the Phillies announced Dillon as their new hitting coach for the 2020 season. He was dismissed from the position on October 3, 2021, before the Phillies played final game of the 2021 season.

References

External links

Joe Dillon at Pura Pelota (Venezuelan Professional Baseball League)

1975 births
Living people
Albuquerque Isotopes players
American expatriate baseball players in Canada
American expatriate baseball players in Japan
Baseball coaches from California
Baseball players from California
Carolina Mudcats players
Durham Bulls players
Edmonton Trappers players
Florida Marlins players
Lansing Lugnuts players
Major League Baseball catchers
Major League Baseball hitting coaches
Major League Baseball infielders
Milwaukee Brewers players
Minor league baseball coaches
Nashville Sounds players
Navegantes del Magallanes players
American expatriate baseball players in Venezuela
New Britain Rock Cats players
Nippon Professional Baseball first basemen
Nippon Professional Baseball outfielders
Nippon Professional Baseball third basemen
Oakland Athletics players
Omaha Golden Spikes players
Santa Rosa Bear Cubs baseball players
Spokane Indians players
Sportspeople from Modesto, California
Syracuse Chiefs coaches
Tampa Bay Rays players
Texas Tech Red Raiders baseball players
Washington Nationals coaches
Wilmington Blue Rocks players
Yomiuri Giants players
Mat-Su Miners players